Paul N. J. Ottosson (born 25 February 1966) is a Swedish sound designer. The recipient of numerous accolades, including three Academy Awards, a BAFTA Award, and a Primetime Emmy Award, he has worked on more than 130 films since 1995.

Selected filmography

 Uncharted (2022)
 The Boss Baby: Family Business
 Bloodshot (2020)
 A Series of Unfortunate Events (2017-2019)
 The Boss Baby (2017)
 Detroit (2017)
 Independence Day: Resurgence (2016)
 Penguins of Madagascar (2014)
 Fury (2014)
 White House Down (2013)
 Zero Dark Thirty (2012)
 Men in Black 3 (2012)
 Battle: Los Angeles (2011)
 2012 (2009)
 Terminator Salvation (2009)
 The Hurt Locker (2008) 
 Spider-Man 3 (2007)
 Spider-Man 2 (2004)
 The Dentist 2 (1998)

Accolades

Notes

References

External links

1966 births
Living people
Swedish audio engineers
Best Sound Mixing Academy Award winners
Best Sound Editing Academy Award winners
Best Sound BAFTA Award winners
People from Osby Municipality
Emmy Award winners